Whixall is a civil parish in Shropshire, England.  It contains 16 listed buildings that are recorded in the National Heritage List for England.  Of these, two are listed at Grade II*, the middle of the three grades, and the others are at Grade II, the lowest grade.  The parish contains small settlements including Whixall and Abbey Green and is otherwise rural.  The Llangollen Canal passes through the parish, and the junction with its Prees Branch is in the parish.  The listed buildings associated with the canal are bridges, including three bascule bridges and a roving bridge, and a former toll house.  The other listed buildings are farmhouses, cottages, a former smithy, and a church.


Key

Buildings

References

Citations

Sources

Lists of buildings and structures in Shropshire